The 1915 USC Trojans football team represented the University of Southern California (USC) in the 1915 college football season. In their second and final year under head coach Ralph Glaze, the Trojans compiled a 3-4 record  and outscored their opponents by a combined total of 132 to 119.  The season featured USC's first ever games against both California (a 28-10 win at Berkeley and a 23-21 loss in Los Angeles) and Oregon (a 34-0 loss).

Schedule

References

USC Trojans
USC Trojans football seasons
USC Trojans football